Princess Sumiko (22 February 1829 – 3 October 1881) was a Japanese princess. She was the head of the Katsura-no-miya from 1863 until 1881.

Life
Sumiko was the daughter of Emperor Kōkaku and his lady-in-waiting, Kanroji Kiyoko. She was the elder half-sister of Chikako, Princess Kazu and Emperor Kōmei. On May 3, 1840, she was engaged with her cousin Prince Kan'in Naruhito; she officially became an imperial princess on October 18, 1842, to make way for her marriage. Two days later, however, Prince Naruhito died before they were married. Afterwards, Princess Sumiko remained unmarried until her death.

In 1863, she succeeded to the head of the Katsura-no-miya house in her own right after the eleventh head, Prince Katsura Misahito, her younger half-brother who died in 1836. The Katsura-no-miya house was one of the four shinnōke, branches of the Imperial Family of Japan which were eligible to succeed to the Chrysanthemum Throne in the event that the main line should die out. This was a very unusual position for a woman.

References

1829 births
1881 deaths
Japanese princesses
19th-century Japanese people
19th-century Japanese women
People from Kyoto Prefecture